The CFA Institute Research Challenge is an annual global competition in equity research hosted by the CFA Institute started in 2007. The competition provides university students with hands-on training and mentoring in financial analysis. Students assume the role of a research analyst and are scored based on their ability to value a stock, write an initiation-of-coverage report, and present their recommendations. The competition is split by 3 geographical regions, Asia Pacific, EMEA, and the Americas. Both undergraduate and graduate students are eligible to participate. Teams begin in local competitions, from which winners advance to regional competitions. A final competition held in April identifies the winning team at the global level.

For 2019, more than 6,100 students from over 1,150 universities from 95 countries participated in the competition.

Team Compositions
Teams are sponsored by a university located within the area of the local competition in which the team wishes to compete. Each university may field up to two teams of three to five members.

Results

 Americas Region Final Champions include New York Regional Final Champions (defunct category after 2013).

Ranking

See also
 CFA Institute
 Chartered Financial Analyst
 Certificate in Investment Performance Measurement

References

External links

Business and finance professional associations

Competitions
Business education

Recurring events established in 2007
Financial advisors
Student events